Scribner v. Straus, 210 U.S. 352 (1908), was a United States Supreme Court case in which the Court held copyright holders did not have the statutory right to control the price of subsequent resales of lawfully purchased copies of their work.

The court decided this case immediately after Bobbs-Merrill Co. v. Straus, which featured the same defendants, Isador Straus and Nathan Straus, being accused of copyright infringement for the same reason by a different company. The result of Bobbs-Merrill Co. v. Straus held sway here.

References

External links
 

1908 in United States case law
United States copyright case law
United States Supreme Court cases
United States Supreme Court cases of the Fuller Court